Michael Allen Harrison is an American new-age musician, songwriter and pianist from Portland, Oregon.

Early years 
Michael started playing the piano at age six. He was prompted by his mother, who thought that playing the piano would help the young Michael to overcome his shyness. Michael attended Parkrose High School in northeast Portland. He released his first commercially available album, "Tea Court Interlude" in 1986.

Performances 
Harrison performed at the United Nations in 1999, in celebration of the 50th anniversary of Israel's independence. Notables for whom he has performed include Bill Clinton, Al Gore, and the 14th Dalai Lama. 
He premiered his children's ballet "The Velveteen Rabbit" with the Vancouver Dance Theater in 1991. He also co-wrote the music for the musical "Prometheus", which was premiered in Portland, Oregon. 
Michael is the owner of MAH records, on which he has recorded and produced over 50 of his own albums within the 25-year-long lifespan of his career. He recorded and performed with Katie Harman, and has recorded and performed with local notable musicians which include Tom Grant, Julianne Johnson, and Patrick Lamb.

Philanthropy 
Michael is the founder and president of the Snowman Foundation. The Snowman Foundation is a non-profit organization dedicated to advocating and providing services for music education. By way of funding this non-profit, Michael organized the Ten Grands concert series, which is presented annually at the Arlene Schnitzer Concert Hall in Portland, Oregon.

In 2018, the Ten Grands concert was played at Ron Tonkin Field in Hillsboro, OR.

Discography 
On MAH Records
 1986 - Tea Court Interlude 
 1988 - Previews 
 1988 - The Snowman / Winter ballet 
 1989 - 3rd Avenue 
 1990 - Moments in Passion 
 1992 - Emotional Connection 
 1993 - Circle of Influence 
 1993 - Enchanted Christmas 
 1994 - Fabric of Life 
 1995 - A Tribute to Gershwin & Friends 
 1995 - Little Neighborhood 
 1995 - Enchanted Christmas Vol II 
 1996 - Matter of Time 
 1996 - Coming of Age 
 1997 - Passion & Grace 
 1997 - The Golden Child 
 1998 - Live at the Benson 
 1998 - Christmas at the Old Church 
 1999 - Seasons of Peace 
 1999 - The Velveteen Rabbit Children's Ballet 
 1999 - Nutcracker Suite 
 2000 - Millennium Live 
 2000 - Cheek to Cheek w/ Julianne Johnson 
 2001 - Reflections of Tea 
 2001 - Snowfall 
 2002 - Inspired w/ Julianne Johnson 
 2002 - Composer /Pianist 
 2002 - Journey Home 
 2003 - Rose Garden Suite 
 2004 - Expressions of Chocolate 
 2004 - Holiday Jazz 
 2004 - Christmas Festival of Lights at The Grotto
 2005 - Bedtime Lullabies 
 2005 - Fireside Carols 
 2005 - Christmas on Peacock Lane w/ Julianne Johnson 
 2005 - Prometheus 
 2006 - Nightingale Lullabies 
 2006 - Notable Impressions 
 2006 - Soul of Love w/ Katie Harmon 
 2007 - Enchanted Christmas Vol.3 
 2007 - At Midnight w/ Patrick Lamb 
 2008 - Fly Me to the Moon 
 2008 - Expressions of Chocolate Vol.2
 2009 - Tango 
 2009 - Simple Gifts w/ Tanner Johnson 
 2009 - Songs of Mary 
 2010 - Christmas Reunion w/ Aaron Meyer
 2011 - Live at Jimmy Mak's
 2012 - The Portland Rose
 2013 - Christmas Dreams
 2015 - Ode to Joy
 2015 - Calling on Angels
 2015 - Christmas at the Old Church 25th Anniversary CD
 2016 - Live at the Grotto

See also
 Claire of the Moon musical director
 Peacock Lane

Notes

References

External links

https://www.snowmanfoundation.org/
Ten Grands

American male singers
Songwriters from Oregon
Living people
Musicians from Portland, Oregon
Year of birth missing (living people)
Singers from Oregon
Parkrose High School alumni
American male pianists
21st-century American pianists
21st-century American male musicians
American male songwriters